Bomarea salsilla is a species of flowering plant in the genus Bomarea, native to Chile. It has gained the Royal Horticultural Society's Award of Garden Merit.

References

salsilla
Endemic flora of Chile
Plants described in 1804